Min Ju-hong (Hangul: 민주홍, born January 1, 1986), better known by his stage name Zizo (Hangul: 지조), is a South Korean rapper. He was a contestant on Show Me the Money 2. He released his first EP, Nice Service 1/2, on July 1, 2014.

Discography

Extended plays

Singles

References

1986 births
Living people
South Korean male rappers
South Korean hip hop singers
21st-century South Korean male  singers
Show Me the Money (South Korean TV series) contestants